North Macedonia–Ukraine relations refers to the bilateral relations of the Republic of North Macedonia and Ukraine. There is an embassy of North Macedonia in Kyiv, while Ukraine maintains an embassy in Skopje. Ukraine also has a consulate in the Macedonian city of Bitola. Over the years, there have been several efforts to strengthen relations between the two countries. North Macedonia provided military aid to Ukraine during the 2022 Russian invasion.

History
Relations between Ukraine and North Macedonia were established on 23 July 1993, when Ukraine recognized the independence of the then Republic of Macedonia. Diplomatic relations were established 20 April 1995 by exchange of notes between the Ministry of Foreign Affairs of Ukraine and the Ministry of Foreign Affairs of North Macedonia. North Macedonia opened an embassy in Kyiv during December 1997. Diplomatic mission of Ukraine in North Macedonia began in June 2000. Ukraine opened an embassy in the Republic of North Macedonia during November 2001.

In July 2019, the two countries signed a deal allowing for visa-free travel for citizens of both countries in the other.

Economic cooperation

In 2011, a number of buses built in a factory in the city of Lviv, western Ukraine, were exported to North Macedonia, numbering close to 100. Ukrainian buses are used in Skopje, the capital of North Macedonia. As of that year, the Lviv bus plant was the sole supplier of buses to North Macedonia.

Political cooperation
A deal was reached between the ministries of culture of the two countries to sell wax figures from a Kyiv factory to a cultural museum of North Macedonia in August 2008. It was part of an agreement to expand cooperation between North Macedonia and Ukraine in the fields of culture, education, and science.

Macedonian ambassadors to Ukraine
The list of ambassadors of North Macedonia to Ukraine.

 Vlado Blazhevski 
 Martin Huleski 
 Ilija Isajlovski
 Aco Spacenoski
 Stolye Zemjkosky

See also
 Foreign relations of North Macedonia
 Foreign relations of Ukraine
 Embassy of North Macedonia, Kyiv

External links
 Ministry of Foreign Affairs of Ukraine — Embassies of Ukraine: Republic of North Macedonia

References

 
Ukraine
Bilateral relations of Ukraine